The 1988 Princeton Tigers football team was an American football team that represented Princeton University during the 1988 NCAA Division I-AA football season. Princeton tied for third in the Ivy League.

In their second year under head coach Steve Tosches, the Tigers compiled a 6–4 record and outscored opponents 269 to 208. Quarterback Jason Garrett was the team captain.

Princeton's 4–3 conference record tied for third in the Ivy League standings. The Tigers outscored Ivy opponents 167 to 130.

Princeton played its home games at Palmer Stadium on the university campus in Princeton, New Jersey.

Schedule

References

Princeton
Princeton Tigers football seasons
Princeton Tigers football